Locket is a 1986 Indian Hindi-language action film, produced by Tahir Hussain on T.V. Films banner and directed by Ramesh Ahuja. Starring Jeetendra, Rekha, Vinod Mehra  and music composed by Bappi Lahiri.

Plot 
The film revolves around a valuable heritage treasure belonging to a royal dynasty. Its heritor Rajasaab is surrounded & slaughtered by his spiteful cousin Tagore Veer Pratap Singh. Before dying, Raja Saab entrusts the guardianship of the route map and his heir Rajkumar Anil Pratap Singh to his true blue Diwan Sardarilal. Diwan makes the map into two pieces and hides it in two identical lockets. The first he places to Rajkumar and the second is given to his son Shankar. In that chaos, Diwan is clutched by Veer Pratap, Rajkumar is rescued by a few villagers, and Diwan’s daughter Sonia is adopted by a wealthy couple whereas Shankar remains with his mother Lakshmi.

Years roll by, and Shankar a valiant village guy, arrives in the city to find the whereabouts of his lost sister Sonia. Rajkumar / Raja becomes a daredevil ruffian and associates with Veer Pratap as an unbeknownst. Destiny befriends Shankar & Raja, Veer Pratap gazes at Shankar‘s caliber and wants to fuse with them. So, he schemes, utilizing a dangerous Shalu one that forcibly grabbed into the profession to catch hold of Shankar. Afterward, she civilizes him when both fall in love. Sonia’s beau Inspector Vijay is a diehard to Veer Pratap. Raja is acquainted with a girl Sunita who falls for her and turns as an undercover Police cop to seize Veer Pratap. Meanwhile, Shankar learns about his father‘s existence through Shalu, so, he becomes a white knight to Veer Pratap, acquires his credence, and also works as a squealer to Vijay. Parallelly, Lakshmi in search of Shankar reaches the city when she accidentally meets Sonia and recognizes her through her mole. After crossing many hurdles Shankar approaches his father and gets knowledge regarding the treasure map inside his locket. Eventually, he detects Raja as the prince by his locket. Being cognizant of it, Veer Pratap conspires and abducts Lakshmi & Sonia too. At last, Shankar & Raja along with Vijay cease him and safeguard the treasure. Finally, the movie ends on a happy note with the marriages of love birds.

Cast 
Jeetendra as Shankar
Rekha as Shalu
Vinod Mehra as Rajkumar Anil Pratap Singh / Raja
Kader Khan as Thakur Veer Pratap Singh
Shreeram Lagoo as Diwan Sardarilal
Nirupa Roy as Laxmi
Iftekhar
Vijayendra Ghatge as Inspector Vijay
Asha Sachdev as Sonia
Murad as Raja Saab
Jagdeep
Jagdish Raj
Rabia Amin
Sudha Chopra

Soundtrack

References 

1980s Hindi-language films
Films scored by Bappi Lahiri